Martin & John is manhwa by Park Hee-jung.

Plot
Three Martins and Three Johns are living in different places and loving each other.  The series is a collection of stories set in different times and places, all involving a man named Martin and a man named John, and the struggle for love between them.

References

External links
 

Romance comics
2006 comics debuts
Fictional LGBT couples
Manhwa titles
Seoul Munhwasa titles